Dragon Creek is a  long 2nd order tributary to the Delaware River in New Castle County, Delaware.

Course
Dragon Creek rises on the Belltown Run divide about 0.25 miles west of Kirkwood, Delaware.

Watershed
Dragon Creek drains  of area, receives about 44.4 in/year of precipitation, has a topographic wetness index of 592.17 and is about 7.9% forested.

See also
List of rivers of Delaware

Maps

References

External links

Rivers of Delaware
Rivers of New Castle County, Delaware
Tributaries of the Delaware River